The Montana Department of Environmental Quality is a state-level government agency in Montana. The agency was founded by the Montana Legislature in 1995 as the Montana Board of Environmental Review. It is responsible for monitoring air, water, energy, and mining standards, in addition to regulatory services.

References 
State agencies of Montana
1995 establishments in Montana